This is a list of the Statistical regions of North Macedonia by Human Development Index as of 2021.

References 

North Macedonia
North Macedonia

Economy of North Macedonia